Kranhaus ("crane house", plural Kranhäuser) refers to each one of the three 17-story buildings in the Rheinauhafen of Cologne, Germany. Their shape, an upside-down "L", is reminiscent of the harbor cranes that were used to load cargo from and onto ships, two of which were left standing as monuments when the harbor was redesigned as a residential and commercial quarter in the early 2000s. They were designed by Aachen architect Alfons Linster and Hamburg-based Hadi Teherani of BRT Architekten. Construction began on 16 October 2006, and the first building was completed in 2008.

The southern and middle buildings provide approx.  of office space each, on 15 levels.

Award 
The middle building, Kranhaus eins, was given the MIPIM Award 2009 in the Business Centre category at the MIPIM in Cannes on 12 March 2009.

References

External links 

 Kranhaus1 website
 Rheinauhafen website

Buildings and structures in Cologne
Tourist attractions in Cologne
Landmarks in Cologne